Douthat is a ghost town in Ottawa County, Oklahoma, United States. Douthat once had a post office, which opened on March 17, 1917. The community was named after Zahn A. Douthat, the owner of the townsite. Douthat is now abandoned and part of the Tar Creek Superfund site.

References

Geography of Ottawa County, Oklahoma
Ghost towns in Oklahoma
Environmental disaster ghost towns